

A

John Adair
B. R. Ambedkar
Giulio Angioni
Jon Altman
Arjun Appadurai
Talal Asad
Timothy Asch
Scott Atran
Marc Augé

B

Nigel Barley
Fredrik Barth
Vasily Bartold
Keith H. Basso
Daisy Bates
Gregory Bateson
Mary Catherine Bateson
Ruth Behar
Ruth Benedict
Dorothy A. Bennett
Carl H. Berendt
Lee Berger
Brent Berlin
Catherine Helen Webb Berndt
Catherine L. Besteman
Theodore C. Bestor
Lewis Binford
Evelyn Blackwood
Wilhelm Bleek
Maurice Bloch
Anton Blok
Franz Boas
Tom Boellstorff
Paul Bohannan
Dmitri Bondarenko
Pere Bosch-Gimpera
Pierre Bourdieu
Philippe Bourgois
Paul Broca
Christian Bromberger
Kari Bruwelheide

C

Julio Caro Baroja
Edmund Carpenter
Napoleon Chagnon
Pierre Clastres
Mabel Cook Cole
Malcolm Carr Collier
Harold C. Conklin
Carleton S. Coon
Frank Hamilton Cushing

D

Regna Darnell
Raymond Dart
Emma Lou Davis
Wade Davis
Ernesto de Martino
Ella Cara Deloria
Raymond J. DeMallie
Philippe Descola
Stanley Diamond
Mary Douglas
Cora Du Bois
Eugene Dubois
Robin Dunbar
Ann Dunham
Katherine Dunham
 Elizabeth Cullen Dunn
Émile Durkheim

E

Mary Lindsay Elmendolf
Verrier Elwin
Matthew Engelke
Friedrich Engels
Arturo Escobar
E. E. Evans-Pritchard

F

James Ferguson
Raymond Firth
Raymond D. Fogelson
Meyer Fortes
Gregory Forth
Dian Fossey
Kate Fox
Robin Fox
James Frazer
Lina Fruzzetti

G

Clifford Geertz
Alfred Gell
Ernest Gellner
Herb Di Gioia
Max Gluckman
Maurice Godelier
Jane Goodall
Marjorie Harness Goodwin
Igor Gorevich
Harold A. Gould
David Graeber
Hilma Granqvist
J. Patrick Gray
Marcel Griaule
Jacob Grimm
Wilhelm Grimm

H

Abdellah Hammoudi
Michael Harkin
Michael Harner
John P. Harrington
Marvin Harris
K. David Harrison
Kirsten Hastrup
Jacquetta Hawkes
Brian Douglas Hayden
Rose Oldfield Hayes
Stephen C. Headley
Thor Heyerdahl
Te Rangi Hīroa (Sir Peter Buck)
Arthur Maurice Hocart
Ian Hodder
E. Adamson Hoebel
Earnest Hooton
Robin W.G. Horton
Aleš Hrdlička
Eva Verbitsky Hunt
Dell Hymes

I

Miyako Inoue
Bill Irons

J

Ira Jacknis
John M. Janzen
Thomas Des Jean
F. Landa Jocano
Alfred E. Johnson
William Jones
Michal Josephy
Jeffrey S. Juris

K

Sergei Kan
Jomo Kenyatta
David Kertzer
Alice Beck Kehoe
Anatoly Khazanov
Dolly Kikon
Richard G. Klein
Chris Knight
Eduardo Kohn
Dorinne K. Kondo
Andrey Korotayev
Conrad Kottak
Charles H. Kraft
Grover Krantz
Alfred L. Kroeber
Theodora Kroeber
Lars Krutak
Adam Kuper

L

William Labov
George Lakoff
Harold E. Lambert
Edmund Leach
Eleanor Leacock
Murray Leaf
Louis Leakey
Mary Leakey
Richard Leakey
Richard Borshay Lee
Charles Miller Leslie
Claude Lévi-Strauss
Ellen Lewin
C. Scott Littleton
Albert Buell Lewis
Oscar Lewis
Phillip Harold Lewis
Roland Littlewood
Iris López
Robert Lowie
Nancy Lurie

M 

Alan Macfarlane
Saba Mahmood
Bronisław Malinowski
George Marcus
Jonathan M. Marks
Karl Marx
John Alden Mason
Michael Atwood Mason
Marcel Mauss
Phillip McArthur
Irma McClaurin
Charles Harrison McNutt
Margaret Mead
Mervyn Meggitt
Josef Mengele
Nicholas Miklouho-Maclay
Emily Martin
Horace Mitchell Miner
Sidney Mintz
Ashley Montagu
James Mooney
Henrietta L. Moore
John H. Moore
Lewis H. Morgan
Desmond Morris
George Murdock
Yolanda Murphy

N 

Laura Nader
Moni Nag
Jeremy Narby
Raoul Naroll
Josiah Nott
Erland Nordenskiöld

O 

Gananath Obeyesekere
Kaori O'Connor
Aihwa Ong
Marvin Opler
Morris Opler
Sherry Ortner
Keith F. Otterbein
Evelia Edith Oyhenart

P 

Elsie Clews Parsons
Bronislav Pilsudski
Thomas J. Pluckhahn
Hortense Powdermaker
A.H.J. Prins
Harald E.L. Prins

Q 

Buell Quain
James Quesada

R

Paul Rabinow
Wilhelm Radloff
Laurence Ralph
Lucinda Ramberg
Roy Rappaport
Hans Ras
Alfred Reginald Radcliffe-Brown
Margaret Read
Gerardo Reichel-Dolmatoff
Kathy Reichs
Audrey Richards
W. H. R. Rivers
Paul Rivet
Joel Robbins
Renato Rosaldo
Gayle Rubin
Robert A. Rubinstein

S

Marshall Sahlins
Noel B. Salazar
Roger Sandall
Edward Sapir
Patricia Sawin
Nancy Scheper-Hughes
Wilhelm Schmidt
Tobias Schneebaum
James C. Scott
Thayer Scudder
Elman Service
Afanasy Shchapov
Gerald F. Schroedl
Florence Connolly Shipek
Sydel Silverman
Audra Simpson
Cathy Small
Christen A. Smith
Jacques Soustelle
Melford Spiro
James Spradley
Julian Steward
Herbert Spencer
Marilyn Strathern
William Sturtevant
Niara Sudarkasa

T

Michael Taussig
Sharika Thiranagama
Edward Burnett Tylor
Colin Turnbull
Victor Turner
Bruce Trigger

V

Karl Verner
L. P. Vidyarthi
Eduardo Viveiros de Castro
Christoph von Fürer-Haimendorf

W

Anthony F. C. Wallace
Lee Henderson Watkins
Camilla Wedgwood
Hank Wesselman
Kath Weston
Douglas R. White
Isobel Mary White 
Leslie White
Tim White
Benjamin Whorf
Unni Wikan
Clark Wissler
Eric Wolf
Alvin Wolfe
Sol Worth

Y

Nur Yalman
Kim Yeshi

Z

Jarrett Zigon
R. Tom Zuidema

Fictional anthropologists

Mary Albright (Jane Curtin) in the sitcom 3rd Rock from the Sun
Temperance "Bones" Brennan (Emily Deschanel)  in the television series Bones
Temperance Brennan in the novel series Temperance Brennan by Kathy Reichs
Chakotay (Robert Beltran) in the television series Star Trek: Voyager
Michael Burnham (Sonequa Martin-Green) in the television series Star Trek: Discovery
Daniel Jackson (Michael Shanks, James Spader) in the television series and film Stargate SG-1
Charlotte Lewis (Rebecca Mader) in the television series Lost

See also
 List of female anthropologists
 List of Black Anthropologists
 List of Chinese sociologists and anthropologists

References

Anthropologists